The Individual Freedom Act, commonly known as the Stop Wrongs to Our Kids and Employees (WOKE) Act is a Florida state law which regulates the content of instruction and training in schools and workplaces. Among other provisions, it prohibits instruction that individuals share responsibility for others' past actions by virtue of their race, sex or national origin. After passing both chambers of the Republican-controlled Florida Legislature along party lines, it was signed by Governor Ron DeSantis on April 22, 2022, and entered into effect July 1 the same year.

Intended by DeSantis to "fight back" against "woke indoctrination" and critical race theory, critics of the law have described it as whitewashing and an attack on the First Amendment. U.S. district judge Mark Walker declared parts of the law relating to workplace diversity training unconstitutional in August 2022, and in November he issued a temporary injunction preventing the law from being enforced in higher education.

See also 

 Florida Parental Rights in Education Act

References 

2022 in Florida
2022 in American law
2022 controversies in the United States
Florida law
United States education law
Censorship in the United States
Ron DeSantis
Florida statutes